Frederic Russell Harty (5 September 1934 – 8 June 1988) was an English television presenter of arts programmes and chat shows.

Early life
Harty was born in  Blackburn, Lancashire, the son of greengrocer Fred Harty, who ran a fruit-and-vegetable stall on the local market, and Myrtle Rishton. He attended Queen Elizabeth's Grammar School on West Park Road in Blackburn, where he enjoyed appearing in school plays and met, for the first time, the then English teacher Ronald Eyre, who directed a number of the productions. Thereafter he studied at Exeter College, Oxford, where he obtained a degree in English literature.

Teaching career
On leaving university, he taught briefly at Blakey Moor Secondary Modern School in Blackburn, then became an English and drama teacher at Giggleswick School in North Yorkshire. "I got a first-class degree, and was a hopeless teacher", Harty later said. However, his friend and Oxford contemporary Alan Bennett commented in his 2016 memoir Keeping On Keeping On that Harty "had a third-class degree and taught brilliantly". Harty's entry in the Oxford Dictionary of National Biography also states  he was awarded a third-class degree in 1957.

Among Harty's pupils at the Giggleswick School were the journalist and television presenter Richard Whiteley and the actor Anthony Daniels. In the mid-1960s Harty spent a year lecturing in English literature at the City University of New York.

Broadcasting career
He began his broadcasting career in 1967 when he became a radio producer for the BBC Third Programme, reviewing arts and literature.

He got his first break in 1970 presenting the arts programme Aquarius, that was intended to be London Weekend Television's response to the BBC's Omnibus. One programme involving a "meeting of cultures" saw Harty travelling to Italy in 1974 to engineer an encounter between the entertainer Gracie Fields and the composer William Walton, two fellow Lancastrians now living on the neighbouring islands of Capri and Ischia. A documentary on Salvador Dalí ("Hello Dalí") directed by Bruce Gowers, won an Emmy. Another award-winning documentary was Finnan Games about a Scottish community, Glenfinnan, where "Bonnie Prince Charlie" raised his standard to begin the Jacobite rising of 1745, and its Highland Games.

In 1972 he interviewed Marc Bolan, who at that time was at the height of his fame as a teen idol and king of glam rock.  During the interview Harty asked Bolan what he thought he would be doing when he was forty or sixty years old, Bolan replying that he didn't think he would live that long. (Bolan subsequently was killed in a car crash two weeks before his 30th birthday on 16 September 1977).

In 1972 he was given his own series, Russell Harty Plus (later simply titled Russell Harty), conducting lengthy celebrity interviews, on ITV, which placed him against the BBC's Parkinson. Parts of Russell Harty's interview with the Who in 1973 were included in Jeff Stein's 1979 film The Kids Are Alright, providing notable moments, such as Pete Townshend and Keith Moon ripping off each other's shirt sleeves. In 1975, he interviewed Alice Cooper, French singer Claude François and was one of the first to acknowledge the fact that the Paul Anka song "My Way" was based on a French song of Claude's called "Comme d'habitude". He would also interview François again in 1977. The show lasted until 1981 and some of his interviews included show business legends Tony Curtis, Danny Kaye, Rita Hayworth, Veronica Lake, David Carradine, John Gielgud, Diana Dors and Ralph Richardson. Harty won a Pye Television Award for the Most Outstanding New Personality of the Year in 1973.

He remained with ITV until 1980, at which point his show moved to the BBC. In November 1980 he interviewed the model Grace Jones. Jones was nervous and distracted during the interview before a live studio audience, and Harty found the interview an uneasy one to conduct, and appeared to be intimidated by Jones, commenting nervously to the audience regarding her demeanour on stage as "It's coming to life, it's coming to life!". Joined later on stage by other guests, Harty was compelled by the seating arrangement on stage to turn his back on Jones, who was left sitting there in silence for an extended period, and after several protests she repeatedly slapped him on the shoulder, causing an entertainment event in 1980s British television that Harty's career would be primarily remembered by. Initially shown on BBC2 in a mid-evening slot, Harty's chatshow ran until 1982 before being moved to an early evening BBC1 slot in 1983 where it was now simply titled Harty. The show ended in late 1984, though Harty would continue to present factual programmes for the BBC for some time afterwards.  In 1985, Harty was invited to the Prince's Palace of Monaco, by Rainier III, Prince of Monaco, to conduct his first interview since the death of Grace Kelly in 1982.

He was the subject of This Is Your Life in December 1980, when he was surprised by Eamonn Andrews at the London department store Selfridges.

In 1986 he interviewed Dirk Bogarde at his house in France, for Yorkshire Television, at Bogarde's invitation. He began working on a new series Russell Harty's Grand Tour for the BBC in 1987.

Personal life
For the last six years of his life, his partner was the Irish novelist Jamie O'Neill. Latterly they resided in Harty's cottage in Giggleswick, North Yorkshire.

Harty was a friend of the playwright Alan Bennett, who talks about him and his family, in relation to Bennett's own family, in the essay "Written on the Body", taken from his semi-biography Untold Stories.

Death
In mid-1988 Harty became ill with hepatitis B and was admitted to St James's University Hospital, Leeds. The Sun tabloid newspaper began around this time publishing stories about his health and private life, claiming that the disease was "related to an HIV/AIDS" infection, and that Harty was in the habit of using teenage male prostitutes.

He died in St James' University Hospital on 8 June 1988 at the age of 53 from liver failure caused by hepatitis. At his funeral Alan Bennett commented in his eulogy that "the gutter press had finished Harty off." His body was buried in the graveyard of St Alkelda Church at Giggleswick.

References

External links
 
 Interview with Debbie Harry
 Interview with Dirk Bogarde

1934 births
1988 deaths
20th-century English LGBT people
Alumni of Exeter College, Oxford
Deaths from hepatitis
English television presenters
English television talk show hosts
Infectious disease deaths in England
British LGBT broadcasters
English LGBT people
People educated at Queen Elizabeth's Grammar School, Blackburn
People from Blackburn
Television personalities from Lancashire